John L. Behan (November 11, 1944 – January 28, 2021) was an American politician who served in the New York State Assembly from 1979 to 1995.

References

External links

|-

1944 births
2021 deaths
Republican Party members of the New York State Assembly